Sri Aurobindo Circle is an annual periodical of the Sri Aurobindo Ashram that was originally published in Bombay, but later from the Pondicherry ashram. During 1947 instalments of Savitri were published in it. As with other ashram journals it contained, besides the writings of Sri Aurobindo, essays and poems written by his disciples and devotees and by students of his thought.

References

 A B Purani, Life of Sri Aurobindo, Sri Aurobindo Ashram, Pondicherry, pp. 237-238

Resources from the Internet Archive 
 Sri Aurobindo Circle, first Number,1945
 Sri Aurobindo Circle, second Number,1946
 Sri Aurobindo Circle, fifth Number,1949
 Sri Aurobindo Circle, sixth Number,1950
 Sri Aurobindo Circle, sixteenth Number,1960

Annual magazines
Magazines published in India
Magazines about spirituality
Magazines with year of establishment missing
Mass media in Mumbai
Sri Aurobindo